Svetlana Ulmasova (born 4 February 1953, died 6 April 2009) was a long-distance runner from the Soviet Union and a former world record holder in the women's 3000 metres (outdoor). She was the 1979 World Cup 3,000 metre champion. She set the world record of 8:27.68 on 25 July 1982. She was a 2 time European Champion over 3,000 metres in 1978 and 1982. As well as a 5-time team medalist at the World Cross Country Championships, twice winning the gold.
Her results on 3000 and 5000 metres are still the current Uzbek records.

Achievements

External links 

IAAF Obituary

1953 births
2009 deaths
Soviet female long-distance runners
Russian female long-distance runners
World record setters in athletics (track and field)
Place of birth missing
European Athletics Championships medalists
Universiade medalists in athletics (track and field)
Goodwill Games medalists in athletics
Universiade bronze medalists for the Soviet Union
Medalists at the 1975 Summer Universiade
Competitors at the 1986 Goodwill Games